Namtaeryeong Station is a station on Seoul Subway Line 4. It is operated by Seoul Metro.

The name of this station literally means "great southern pass," referring to a passageway linking Seoul and Gwacheon, between Mt. Gwanak and Mt. Umyeon. Actually this name began from Choson Dynasty. King Jeong-Jo(정조), the 22nd King of Choson, had gone to Hwaseong Fortress, Suwon, where the Jeong-Jo's father was buried on. When Jeong-Jo came back to palace, he passed the hill named 'Fox Hill.' But King Jeong-Jo didn't know about this hill's name, and suddenly he saw one old man, so he asked to him "What is this hill's name?" So the old man answered "Oh lord! This hill's name is Namtaeryeong." However, the one vassal already knew what's this hill's real name; Fox Hill, so he contradict to old man and said "No! This hill's name is Fox Hill." So King Jeong-Jo was really wondered that why old man lied to him. So the old man said "Actually fox is very vicious and sly animal, so I couldn't say the real name to you, because you are the King of us, so I couldn't make a mess to your name, I decided to tell you the better name Namtaeryeong, which means 'Great Hill located on Southern part,' instead Fox Hill." So King Jeong-Jo was so impressed to old man, and decided to change that hill's name Fox Hill to Namtaeryeong.

Most of the provincial railways in South Korea were built with Japanese expertise when Korea was under Japanese rule. Trains still run on the left hand side of the track on these railways. But the Seoul Subway, which was constructed much later in the 1970s, ran on the right hand track. Therefore, between Namtaeryeong and Seonbawi Stations, where the two lines connect, the underground tracks must cross over from right hand drive in Namtaeryeong to left hand drive in Seonbawi. It is an island platform with two lines on one side, and a screen door is installed. There are 4 exits.

Station layout

References

Seoul Metropolitan Subway stations
Railway stations opened in 1994
Metro stations in Seocho District
Metro stations in Gwanak District